After the de facto merger on 1 November 1954 and before the legal integration with the Indian Union on 16 August 1962, second general elections were held in August 1959 to constitute Second Pondicherry Representative Assembly.

Background
the Congress, with the support of independents, was able to form a Government after first elections in 1955. However, that government was not stable as the ruling party was ridden with personal strife and factions. The Government of India had to intervene finally by dissolving the Assembly and the Chief Commissioner took over the administration in October 1958. Later, after nine months, second general elections were held to the Pondicherry Representative Assembly in 1959 from 11 to 14 August.

Results
The results of 1959 election were summarized below:

Another reference with some change in voteshare were summarized below:

However, during 1963, the state of parties in the Representative Assembly was: Congress, 24; People's Front (Makkaḷ Munnaṇi (Tamil:மக்கள் முன்னணி)), 12; Praja Socialist Party, 1; Independents, 2.

Members of the 1959 Pondicherry Representative Assembly

Council of ministers of Reddiar (1959-1963)
Under supervision of then chief commissioner L.R.S Singh a Council of ministers was formed under leadership of V. Venkatasubba Reddiar: on 9 September 1959. President of the assembly that is equivalent to speaker was A. S. Gangeyan.

Council of ministers of Goubert (1963-1964)
The French settlements of India were de jure transferred on 16 August 1962. Pondicherry Representative Assembly functioned until June 30, 1963 and succeeded by Puducherry Legislative Assembly. The Indian Parliament enacted the Government of Union Territories Act, 1963 that came into force on 1 July 1963, and the pattern of Government prevailing in the rest of the country was introduced in this territory also, but subject to certain limitations. Edouard Goubert became the chief minister in the subsequent Pondicherry Legislative Assembly.

In the First Legislative Assembly of Pondicherry, under supervision of then chief commissioner S.K. Datta  a Council of ministers was formed under leadership of Édouard Goubert: on 1 July 1963. Speaker was A. S. Gangeyan.

Trivia
In Yanam, for Kanakalapeta constituency, two independents secured exactly 707 votes each and so to decide the winner, lots were cast. Finally, Kamichetty Savithri was declared winner. In the same constituency, Congress candidate polled only 8 votes.

See also

Puducherry Legislative Assembly
1946 French India Representative Assembly election
1951 French India Representative Assembly election
1955 Pondicherry Representative Assembly election
Elections in Puducherry

References

Notes

State Assembly elections in Puducherry
French India
Elections in France
Puducherry